Neinar Seli (born 7 December 1959 in Tartu) is an Estonian sports figure (hammer throw), entrepreneur and politician.

He was a member of IX Riigikogu.

From 2012 to 2016 he was the president of Estonian Olympic Committee.

In 2006 he was awarded with Order of the White Star, III class.

References

Living people
1959 births
Estonian male hammer throwers
Estonian businesspeople
Estonian Reform Party politicians
Members of the Riigikogu, 1999–2003
Recipients of the Order of the White Star, 3rd Class
University of Tartu alumni
Academic staff of the University of Tartu
People from Tartu
Sportspeople from Tartu